Ekkeland Götze (born August 14, 1948) is a German painter, printmaker and conceptual artist.

Life 

Götze was born in Dresden on August 14, 1948. After a training as a screen printer he educated himself as an industrial engineer through a correspondence course. He was not allowed to study painting since he was lacking the "Abitur" educational achievement, but Gerhard Kettner, president of the Dresden Academy of Fine Arts, provided him with a teaching assignment for screen printing anyway. Götze painted in his spare time, but he was not allowed to exhibit because of regulations in East Germany - formally he was a printmaker, not a painter. Because of these restrictions he filed an application for an exit permit 1985 which was granted in 1988. He immediately moved from Dresden to Munich, West Germany, where he opened up a printshop for artists. He is also co-owner of a garment company.

Works 

In 1989 Götze started to work on a project called "Erde" ("Earth"). He collects soil samples at extraordinary sites of human history around the world and applies them to paper, lime mortar or other backgrounds, making use of a standardized, self-developed technique he calls "terragraphy": He grinds the soil, mixes it with a binder and then applies it making use of a technique similar to screen printing. All backgrounds are square and of identical size. For each site the resulting works of art are given an individual name that reflects the importance of the site. According to Götze, the pictures capture th "spirit and energy" of the place where the soil was gathered. German theatre researcher Christopher Balme described Götzes role during the emergence of his works as that of a "medium in a shamanistic sense". During the course of the project, Götze visited various European and North American countries as well as e.g. Australia, Brazil, Egypt, Japan, Madagascar, New Zealand, South Africa, Tibet and Venezuela. In addition to the prints Götzes uses photos of the sites to contextualize the prints. Between 1990 and 2001, Götze compiled and published 13 artist's books depicting the "Erde" works, one site per book. For the book about New Zealand he cooperated with local artist Christina Wirihana. In 2014 he designed an album cover for German jazz trio Kolb Schindler Schubert.

Götze runs a studio in Sendling. He is a member of the Neue Gruppe, an association of Munich artists regularly exhibiting at the Haus der Kunst museum. In 2018 Götze has been awarded the Seerosenpreis, a yearly award assigned to visual artists by the city of Munich.

Exhibitions

Solo exhibitions 
 2009: Bild der Erde (Berlin, Federal Foreign Office)
 2011: Das Bild der Erde (Munich, vernissage in the Center for Advanced Studies at the Ludwig Maximilian University of Munich)
 2012: Goethe-Institut, Tokyo, Japan
 2017: Erde und Licht (Maloja, Chiesa Bianca di Maloja)
 2022: Bild der Erde (Museum of Man and Nature, Munich)

Group exhibitions 
 2006: 4th International Artist’s Book Triennial, Vilnius
 2009: Made in Munich: Munich Editions 1968-2008 (Munich, Haus der Kunst)
 2012: Possible Water (Tokyo, Goethe-Institut Tokyo, with i.a. Agnes Meyer-Brandis)
 2017: Faktor X (Munich, Haus der Kunst, with i.a. Tamiko Thiel)

References

External links 

 Official Website
 El Hombre Tierra - Photo story in Esquire magazine (LatAm edition, Spanish)

1948 births
Artists from Dresden
German contemporary artists
Living people